Michael Van Praet (born May 29, 1989) is a Canadian football offensive lineman who is currently playing CIS football with the Western Mustangs. Following the 2011 CIS season Van Praet was invited to the 2012 CFL Evaluation Camp where he won the bench rep competition doing 38 reps of 225 pounds.

Professional career
Despite participating in the 2012 CFL Evaluation Camp Van Praet elected to return to the Mustangs for one more year of CIS football.

References

1989 births
Canadian football defensive linemen
Living people
Players of Canadian football from Ontario
Sportspeople from London, Ontario
Western Mustangs football players